The women's halfpipe competition of the FIS Snowboarding World Championships 2011 was held at Alabaus in La Molina, Spain between January 19 and 20, 2011. 32 athletes from 15 countries competed.

The qualification round was completed on January 19, while the final was completed on January 20.

Results

Qualification
The results of the qualification round:

Heat 1

Heat 2:

Semifinal
The results of the semifinal round:

Final
The results of the final round:The results of the semifinal round:

References

Halfpipe, women's